Petar Petrov Stoyanov (born on 15 August 1985) is a Bulgarian footballer who plays as a midfielder.

Career

Sliven 2000
He started his career in Bulgaria with OFC Sliven 2000. With Sliven he completed 77 matches scoring also 4 goals. He left the club at February 2011 for PFC CSKA Sofia.

CSKA Sofia
He stayed at Cska Sofia for one and a half season. He played 3 matches during his first season at the club and 16 during his second season. He scored his only goal during the second season against POFC Botev Vratsa in a 2-2 away draw.

Olympiakos Volou
On 22 September 2012 he signed a one-year contract with Olympiakos Volou 1937 F.C. He played his first match for Olympiakos against Kavala F.C. in a 2-0 home win.

Honours

Club
PFC CSKA Sofia
Bulgarian Cup: 2011
Bulgarian Supercup: 2011

External links
 

1985 births
Living people
Bulgarian footballers
OFC Sliven 2000 players
PFC CSKA Sofia players
FC Lyubimets players
First Professional Football League (Bulgaria) players
Association football midfielders
Sportspeople from Sliven